Richard Barnack was an English 16th-century vicar and vice-chancellor at the University of Oxford.

He was a doctor of divinity at New College, Oxford. In 1519, he was appointed Vice-Chancellor of Oxford University, continuing until 1520, and was vicar of Adderbury in northern Oxfordshire.

References

Bibliography
 

Year of birth unknown
Year of death unknown
Alumni of New College, Oxford
Vice-Chancellors of the University of Oxford
16th-century English Roman Catholic priests